Cellamare is a town and comune in the Metropolitan City of Bari, in Apulia, in southern Italy.

The town claims to have been founded by Archbishop Rainaldo in the year 1171.

Origin of Town Name: Cella D'Amore
Primary Industry: Agrarian Community - Grapes

References

Cities and towns in Apulia